The Franconia Range is a mountain range located in the White Mountains of the U.S. state of New Hampshire. It is the second-highest range of peaks (after the Presidential Range) in the White Mountains.

Franconia Ridge is a prominent ridge which forms the backbone of the range, stringing together all of its major summits.

Summits 
From north to south, the highest summits of the range include:
 Mount Lafayette  *
 Mount Truman  
 Mount Lincoln   *
 Little Haystack Mountain  
 Mount Liberty   *
 Mount Flume   *
The summits marked with an asterisk (*) are included on the Appalachian Mountain Club's peak-bagging list of "Four-thousand footers" in New Hampshire.

Features

The Franconia Range hosts the third largest connected area of alpine tundra in the United States east of the Rocky Mountains, only surpassed by the Presidential Range and the Katahdin massif.

Approximately  along the crest of the ridge is in the alpine zone. This area runs from the treeline just below the summit of Little Haystack all the way to the treeline north of Mount Lafayette, and affords constant 360-degree views of the White Mountains. To the east of the ridge lies the rugged and uninhabited Pemigewasset Wilderness.

Mount Liberty and Mount Flume are almost entirely forested; their summits rise just above the treeline, providing views of the area.

Hiking
The Franconia Ridge Trail, which coincides with the Appalachian Trail from Mount Lafayette to Mount Liberty, traverses the ridge over all the aforementioned mountains.

One hike on the ridge is an 8.9-mile (14.3-km) loop involving the Falling Waters Trail, the Franconia Ridge Trail, the Greenleaf Trail, and the Old Bridle Path, which includes the majority of the above-treeline portion of the ridge.

Dangers

The exposed nature of the ridge and the changeable weather of the White Mountains make it a more dangerous hike than it may appear. Injuries and even fatalities from falls and exposure are not uncommon.

References

External links
 

Mountain ranges of New Hampshire
White Mountains (New Hampshire)
Landforms of Grafton County, New Hampshire
Ridges of New Hampshire